The Kongkong River, also spelled Kong Kong, is a stream in the South Sudanese state of Jonglei, west of Boma National Park near the Ethiopian border. At the village of Bongak it joins the Abara River to form the Agwei or Agvey River, a tributary of the Pibor River. It is within the drainage basin of the White Nile.

External links 
Map of Jonglei
Kongkong River

Rivers of South Sudan
Jonglei State
Greater Upper Nile
Nile basin